Magut is a surname of Kenyan origin. Notable people with the surname include:

Eliud Magut, Kenyan marathon runner and winner of the 2012 French Riviera Marathon
James Magut (born 1990), Kenyan middle-distance runner

Kenyan names